Kana Cone is a red nested cinder cone in northern British Columbia, Canada, located northeast of Eve Cone in Mount Edziza Provincial Park. 
Adopted 2 January 1980 on 104G/12, as submitted by Geological Survey of Canada.

See also
List of volcanoes in Canada
List of Northern Cordilleran volcanoes
Volcanism of Canada
Volcanism of Western Canada

References

Cinder cones of British Columbia
Holocene volcanoes
Monogenetic volcanoes
Mount Edziza volcanic complex
One-thousanders of British Columbia